"Is That You Mo-Dean?" is a song by The B-52's released as the second single from their album Good Stuff. It was written by all the band members. The song originated from a stage chant the band would play in their early days to fill time on the frequent occasions when guitarist Ricky Wilson would break a guitar string. Lead singer Fred Schneider would call and respond "Is that you, Mo-Dean?" with the audience (a name derived from Maureen ("Mo") Dean, wife of Watergate scandal lawyer John Dean, but here used as the name of an imaginary alien prankster). He would alternate between this and asking the audience if there were any questions — but unable to make out the responses, he would instead just invent questions on his own and respond to them. Fred would continue until Ricky had fixed his strings, and the show would resume.

Despite the success of the previous single "Good Stuff", the song failed to chart. It nevertheless became one of the most popular tracks from Good Stuff and a live favorite for many years. The CD and 12" singles for the song have various remixes of "Is That You Mo-Dean?" by Moby.

The single edit of the song was included on the band's greatest hits compilation Time Capsule: Songs for a Future Generation. The music video for the song was featured on The B-52s’ music video collection The B-52's Time Capsule: Videos for a Future Generation 1979-1998.

Track listing
 "Is That You Mo-Dean?" (Interdimension Mix) – 6:32
 "Is That You Mo-Dean?" (Liquid Sky Dub) – 6:13
 "Tell It Like It T-I-Is" (MK Dub) – 6:19
 "Is That You Mo-Dean?" (Harpapella) – 3:07

Tracks 1, 2 and 4 remixed by Moby.
Track 3 remixed by MK.

Charts

References

1992 singles
1992 songs
The B-52's songs
Song recordings produced by Don Was
Songs written by Fred Schneider
Songs written by Kate Pierson
Songs written by Keith Strickland
Reprise Records singles